Sandra Joković is a politician in Serbia. She has served in the National Assembly of Serbia since 2020 as a member of the Serbian Progressive Party.

Early life and career
Joković was born in Kraljevo, Serbia, in what was then the Socialist Federal Republic of Yugoslavia. A graduate of the College of Vocational Studies for Teachers in Kruševac, she subsequently took specialized studies and worked as a pre-school and kindergarten teacher in Kraljevo. As of 2020, she is working toward the completion of a master's degree in the field.

She is a member of Serbia's Roma community. In a January 2020 interview, she said that she had not personally experienced discrimination on the basis of her background, though she had seen anti-Roma discrimination affecting others and was critical of media depictions of the community.

Politician

Parliamentarian
Joković was given the 168th position on the Progressive Party's Aleksandar Vučić — For Our Children list in the 2020 parliamentary election and was elected when the list won a landslide majority with 188 out of 250 mandates. She is now a member of the assembly committee on human and minority rights and gender equality, a deputy member of the committee on the rights of the child and the committee on labour, social issues, social inclusion, and poverty reduction, a deputy member of Serbia's delegation to the NATO Parliamentary Assembly (where Serbia has observer status), the leader of Serbia's parliamentary friendship group with Papua New Guinea, and a member of the parliamentary friendship groups with Brazil, Cuba, Cyprus, Greece, the Philippines, Portugal, Spain, the United Arab Emirates, and Venezuela.

Municipal politics
Joković received the thirty-fifth position on the Progressive Party's list for the Kraljevo city assembly in the 2020 Serbian local elections and was elected when the list won a majority victory with forty-six out of seventy mandates.

References

1990 births
Living people
Politicians from Kraljevo
Serbian Romani people
Members of the National Assembly (Serbia)
Deputy Members of the NATO Parliamentary Assembly
Serbian Progressive Party politicians
21st-century Serbian women politicians
21st-century Serbian politicians
Women members of the National Assembly (Serbia)